Eutropis dawsoni, also known commonly as Gans's grass skink and Gans's mabuya, is a species of lizard in the family Scincidae. The species is endemic to the southern Western Ghats, India.

Etymology
The specific name, dawsoni, is in honor of F.W. Dawson who was Director of the Trivandrum Museum.

The specific name of the synonym, gansi, is in honor of American herpetologist Carl Gans.

Geographic range
E. dawsoni is found in Tamil Nadu and Kerala, southern India.

The type locality of the formerly recognized Eutropis gansi is "2 km NW of Muthalar Road Cross off Sengaltheri–Thalayanai road (towards Moolakasam), Kalakkad Tiger Reserve, Tirunelveli district, Tamil Nadu State, India".

Habitat

Reproduction
The mode of reproduction of E. dawsoni is unknown.

References

Further reading
Annandale N (1909). "Report on a small collection of Lizards from Travancore". Records of the Indian Museum 3 (3): 253–257. (Lygosoma dawsonii, new species, p. 257).
Das I (1991). "A New Species of Mabuya from Tamil Nadu State, Southern India (Squamata: Scincidae)". Journal of Herpetology 25 (3): 342–344. (Mabuya gansi, new species).
Ganesh SR, Deuti K, Achyuthan NS, Campbell P, Raha S, Bag P, Debnath S (2021). "Taxonomic reassessment of Eutropis macularia (Blyth, 1853) complex in the Western Ghats of India: Resurrection of Eutropis brevis (Günther, 1875), Eutropis dawsoni (Annandale, 1909) and synonymisation of Eutropis gansi (Das, 1991) (Reptilia:Squamata: Scincidae)". Records of the Zoological Survey of India 121 (3): 363–374.
Mausfeld P, Schmitz A, Böhme W, Misof B, Vrcibradic D, Freder C (1991). "Phylogenetic Affinities of Mabuya atlantica Schmidt, 1945, Endemic to the Atlantic Ocean Archipelago of Fernando de Noronha (Brazil): Necessity of Partitioning the Genus Mabuya Fitzinger, 1826 (Scincidae: Lygosominae)". Zoologischer Anzeiger 241: 281–293. (Eutropis gansi, new combination).

Eutropis
Reptiles of India
Endemic fauna of the Western Ghats
Reptiles described in 1909
Taxa named by Nelson Annandale